We All Lay Down In The End is Taiwanese Mandopop artist Stanley Huang's 6th Mandarin studio album. It was released on 5 December 2008 by Warner Music Taiwan (華納唱片).

Like previous albums, one more edition was released, We All Lay Down In The End (AERO Version)(最後只好躺下來 (AERO旗艦版)), on 10 January 2009, including a bonus DVD containing three behind-the-scene footages with music videos.

Track listing
吃我 (Chi Wo) - Eat Me, Drink Me - 3:24
黑夜盡頭 (Hei Ye Jin Tou) - Night's Almost Over - 3:40
明天見 (Ming Tian Jian) - See You Tomorrow - 3:26
黑寡婦 (Hei Gua Fu) - Kiss of the Black Widow - 3:13
最後只好躺下來 (Zui Hou Zhi Hao Tang Xia Lai) - We All Lay Down In the End - 4:52
望塵莫及 (Wang Chen Mo Ji) - Hey You - 3:15
巴別塔 (Ba Bie Ta) - Tower of Babel - 3:59
侵略地球 (Qin Lue Di Qiu) - My Earth - 3:50
狂信者  (Kuang Xin Zhe) - Adulation - 3:43
十八啊 (Shi Ba A) - Ah Eighteen - 3:15

Bonus DVD
We All Lay Down In The End (AERO Version) - Behind The Scenes + MV
 "最後只好躺下來" (We All Lay Down In the End)
 "黑夜盡頭" (Night's Almost Over)
 "巴別塔" (Tower of Babel)

References

2008 albums
Stanley Huang albums